Flores Chaviano (born 10 December 1946) is an accomplished Cuban composer, guitarist, professor and orchestral conductor that has achieved great international recognition.

Academic background

Flores Chaviano began his musical studies in his native city of Caibarién, where he received instruction from professor Pedro Julio del Valle, which continued at a later time at the National School of Arts (ENA) in Havana, with renowned professor Isaac Nicola, founder of the modern Cuban Guitar School. Chaviano also studied musical composition at the Instituto Superior de Artes (ISA) with José Ardévol and Sergio Fernández Barroso. After his arrival in Madrid in 1981, he studied at the Real Conservatorio Superior de Música with professor Demetrio Ballesteros. He also includes in his musical formation master classes from the prominent guitarists Leo Brouwer and Alirio Díaz.

Composer

As composer, his artistic works have been recognized by the specialized critique and today he is considered as one of the most important Cuban composers. He has received commissions from CDMC, the Fundación Príncipe de Asturias, the Radio Nacional de España and the Conservatorio de Nalón. Flores Chaviano was president of the composers organization from the Brigada Hermanos Saíz in Cuba during the 1970s.

Chaviano possesses an ample catalog of compositions for a wide variety of ensembles, soloist, choir, ballet, symphonic orchestra, solo guitar and in other formats. His music has been performed by prestigious orchestral and chamber groups such as the Orquesta Sinfónica Nacional de México D. F.,the Gdansk Academy in Poland, the Orquesta Sinfónica del Principado de Asturias (OSPA), the Orquesta y Coros de la Comunidad de Madrid, the Orquesta Sinfónica de Granada, the Orquesta Clásica de Madrid, the Filarmónica de Montevideo, Uruguay, the Orquesta Simón Bolívar de Caracas, Venezuela, the Orquesta Sinfónica del Salvador, the Orquesta Sinfónica de Matanzas, Cuba, the Orquesta de Cámara de Nalón, Asturias, España, the Mutare Ensemble from Frankfurt, the Cuarteto Latinoamericano de México, the Quintet of the Komische Opera from Berlin, the Ensemble 21 from New York, the Percussion Quartet of the Florida International University, the Cuarteto Entrequatre de Asturias, the Coro de la Fundación Príncipe de Asturias, the Grupo Círculo and many others. The guitar pieces from Flores Chaviano are considered among the most valued of the modern guitar repertoire.

Guitarist

Flores Chaviano has developed an outstanding career as a contemporary style guitarist, which has been endorsed by his performances as a soloist as well as accompanied by a symphonic orchestra. He has worked intensely offering concerts and galas in Cuba and other countries in Asia, Europe and America. Among his most prominent presentations are those at the Chopin Society of Varsovia, the Lincoln Center in New York City, the Kennedy Center in Washington, the Teatro Real de Madrid, the Círculo de Bellas Artes, and the Auditorio Nacional de Música also at that city and the Teatro de Bellas Artes de México; he has participated at the international guitar festivals of Granada, Alicante and Navarra, Spain, as well as in the Encuentro de Guitarristas de América Latina y el Caribe in Havana, Cuba. He has performed with Cuban orchestras such as those from Santiago de Cuba and Matanzas and the Orquesta Sinfónica Nacional, and also has played with the Orquesta Sinfónica Nacional as well as the New World Symphony in Miami and from the Gdansk Musical Academy in Poland.

Conductor

Flores Chaviano has conducted an important work as musical director and founder of different instrumental groups such as the Ensemble de Segovia, the group Sonido Trece, the Cuarteto Fin de Siglo, the Agrupación Trova Lírica Cubana de Madrid and the Capilla Musical Esteban Salas, based in Madrid and constituted by singers and a small instrumental group, focused on recovering and promoting the music of Esteban Salas and the colonial Hispano-American musical heritage. He has been a founder of the Andrés Segovia in Memoriam Festival, sponsored by the Sociedad General de Autores y Editores de España (SGAE), and also an organizer of the Festival Internacional de Guitarra de Ponferrada, Spain.

Professor 

Along with his artistic work, Flores Chaviano has developed an important labor in the musical education field. He was a professor at the Conservatorio "Esteban Salas" of Santiago de Cuba, professor of guitar in the Escuela Nacional de Arte (ENA), the "Amadeo Roldán" Conservatory and the Instituto Superior de Artes (ISA) of Havana. He has also offered contemporary guitar courses at the "Manuel de Falla Courses" in Granada, the Florida International University, the Cátedra "Andrés Segovia" at the Beijing Conservatory, the University of Puerto Rico, the Universidad de Salamanca, the Superior Conservatories of Madrid, Granada and Murcia in Spain the Conservatorio Superior de México and the Superior Conservatories of Rostock and Berlin in Germany. Flores Chaviano currently teaches guitar and chamber music at the Conservatorio Profesional "Federico Moreno Torroba" of Madrid.

For his long and fruitful career as composer, guitarist, professor and conductor, Flores Chaviano is one of the most prestigious and representative Cuban musicians within the Spanish contemporary musical panorama. His work is highly valued by the Spanish specialized musical critique as by the modern musical composers and performers.

Awards and recognitions

In 1974, Flores Chaviano received the First Prize at the National Guitar Contest of the Unión de Escritores y Artistas de Cuba.

Work

Ballet
 Encuentro, 1978

Instrumental Ensemble
 A partir de un canto yoruba, 1977, para flauta, clarinete y fagot 
 Rítmicas núm. 1, para tres percusionistas, 1988
 Entrequatre II, 1989–1990, para violín, viothey cello
 Tres escenas yoruba, 1990
 Patakkín Olorum, 1996
 Obertura V Aniversario y Parrandas, música para once percusionistas, 1997

Choir
 Ven primavera mía, ven, 1968
 Canción cantada y Tres canciones, para coro infantil, 1979 
 Tres rítmicas, para coro infantil, 1978 
 10 de Octubre, 1979 
 Thepalma, 1986, coro y orquesta infantil 
 Tres canciones cubanas, 1987, para coro mixto

Guitar
 Seis aires populares cubanos, 1971-1982  
 Variaciones sobre el yényere, 1973 
 Homenaje a Víctor Jara, para flauta y guitarra, 1974  
 Réquiem a un sonero (homenaje a Miguel Matamoros), 1975  
 Para dos, para guitarra, 1978 
 Concierto, para guitarra y orquesta, 1979 
 Espacio, tiempo... recuerdos 
 Cinco estudios de grafía  
 Textura I, para conjunto de guitarras, 1983		 
 Seis danzas cubanas, para cuatro guitarras, 1984  
 Concertante 1, para guitarra y conjunto instrumental 
 Textura II, para conjunto de guitarra, 1985 
 Trío, 1986, para flauta, violín y guitarra  
 Espacio en blanco, para dos guitarras 
 Tríptico a John Lennon, para cuatro guitarras  
 Quasar/Gen 87, para flauta, saxofón barítono, guitarra y percusión  
 Trío, para flauta, viothey guitarra 
 Villalobos/87 (Homenaje), para tres, guitarra eléctrica y percusión, 1987 
 Son de negros en Cuba, 1988, para cuatro guitarras y percusión  
 Álbum núm. 1, para guitarra  
 Suite Bergidum, 1992 
 Álbum infantil núm. 2, 1993  
 Concierto, para cuatro guitarras y orquesta  
 Suite de danzas populares, para guitarra y piano, 1994  
 Cinco contradanzas cubanas, 1995, para guitarra y piano 
 , 1996 
 Entrequatre, para cuatro guitarras
 Soñada en Gijon (11 string guitar) dedicate to Christian Lavernier

See also

Music of Cuba

References

External links
 https://www.youtube.com/channel/UCxkI_U_V8knqvqF9LjegBBg 
 http://www.19trastes.com/fchaviano.htm
 http://floreschaviano.blogspot.com/
 http://www.caimanbarbudo.cu/entrevistas/2014/09/entrevista-con-flores-chaviano/
 http://www.compositoresfaic.com/compositores-curriculum.php?idComp=221
 CTV
 Hispanocuba
 Sibiu European Capital of Culture 2007 sobre su obra presentada por el Instituto Cervantes
 Artículo sobre theCapiltheMusical Esteban Salas 

1946 births
Living people
Cuban composers
Male composers
Cuban guitarists
Cuban male guitarists
Cuban classical guitarists
21st-century classical composers
People from Caibarién
Male classical composers
21st-century guitarists
21st-century male musicians
National Art Schools (Cuba) alumni
Cuban male musicians